Savvas Tsabouris (born 16 July 1986) is a Greek former professional footballer who played as a right-back.

Career
Tsabouris previously played for Egaleo, Ilisiakos, Chaidari and Asteras Tripolis. In the summer of 2014 he was transferred to Kalloni. On 20 May 2016, he signed a contract with Cypriot club Nea Salamina for an undisclosed fee.

On 30 June 2021, Apollon Smyrnis announced his retirement as a professional footballer, but not his retirement from an involvement in football, naming him in the same announcement as the new team manager of the club.

Career statistics

Honours
Asteras Tripolis
Greek Cup runner-up: 2012–13

References

1986 births
Living people
Chaidari F.C. players
Egaleo F.C. players
Asteras Tripolis F.C. players
AEL Kalloni F.C. players
Nea Salamis Famagusta FC players
Levadiakos F.C. players
Apollon Smyrnis F.C. players
Super League Greece players
Super League Greece 2 players
Cypriot First Division players
Expatriate footballers in Cyprus
Association football midfielders
Association football fullbacks
Footballers from Athens
Greek footballers